Together, legal psychology and forensic psychology form the field more generally recognized as "psychology and law". Following earlier efforts by psychologists to address legal issues, psychology and law became a field of study in the 1960s as part of an effort to enhance justice, though that originating concern has lessened over time. The multidisciplinary American Psychological Association's Division 41, the American Psychology-Law Society, is active with the goal of promoting the contributions of psychology to the understanding of law and legal systems through research, as well as providing education to psychologists in legal issues and providing  education to legal personnel on psychological issues. Further, its mandate is to  inform the psychological and legal communities and the public at large  of current research, educational, and service in the area of psychology and law. There are similar societies in Britain and Europe.

Areas of research
Generally speaking, any research that combines psychological principles with legal applications or contexts could be considered legal psychology (although research involving clinical psychology, e.g., mental illness, competency, insanity defense, offender profiling, etc., is typically categorized as forensic psychology, and not legal psychology). For a time, legal psychology researchers were primarily focused on issues related to eyewitness testimony and jury decision-making; so much so, that the editor of Law and Human Behavior, the premier legal psychology journal, implored researchers to expand the scope of their research and move on to other areas.

There are several legal psychology journals, including Law and Human Behavior, Psychology, Public Policy and Law, Psychology, Crime, and Law, and Journal of Psychiatry, Psychology and Law that focus on general topics of criminology, and the criminal justice system. In addition, research by legal psychologists is regularly published in more general journals that cover both basic and applied research areas. The Online Jury Research Update (OJRU) regularly summarizes legal psychology  research about legal persuasion, jury research and trial advocacy.

In March 1893 J. McKeen Cattell posted questions to fifty-six of his students at Columbia University, the questions he asked his students were comparable to those asked in a court of justice. What he found was that it was reasonable to conclude eyewitness accounts of events were unreliable. His students were all sure they were mostly correct, even when they weren't, and some were hesitant when they were in fact correct.  He could not figure out specifically why each student had inaccurate testimonies. Cattell suggested that “an unscrupulous attorney” could discredit a witness who is being truthful by asking “cunningly selected questions”. Although a jury, or the judge, should know how normal errors are in eyewitness testimonies given different conditions. However, even Cattell was shocked by the level of incorrectness displayed by his students. Cattell's research has been depicted as the foundation of forensic psychology in the United States. His research is still widely considered a prevailing research interest in legal psychology. It has been thought that in America psychologists have been used as expert witnesses in court testimonies since the early 1920s. Consultation within civil courts was most common, during this time criminal courts rarely consulted with psychologists. Psychologists were not considered medical experts, those who were like, physicians and psychiatrists, in the past were the ones consulted for criminal testimonies. This could be because in criminal cases, the defendant's mental state almost never  mattered "As a general rule, only medical men—that is, persons licensed by law to practice the profession of medicine—can testify as experts on the question of insanity; and the propriety of this general limitation is too patent to permit discussion".

Training and education
Legal psychologists typically hold a PhD in some area of psychology (e.g., clinical psychology, social psychology, cognitive psychology, etc.), and apply their knowledge of that field to the law. Although formal legal training (such as a JD or Master of Legal Studies degree) can be beneficial, most legal psychologists hold only the PhD. In fact, some argue that specialized legal training dilutes the psychological empiricism of the researcher. For instance, to understand how eyewitness memory "works", a psychologist should be concerned with memory processes as a whole, instead of only the aspects relevant to the law (e.g., lineups, accuracy of testimony). To understand false confessions, a psychologist should be familiar with research on decision making, compliance, obedience, persuasion, and other forms of social influence.

A growing number of universities offer specialized training in legal psychology as either a standalone PhD program or a joint JD/PhD program. A list of American universities that offer graduate training in legal psychology can be found here on the website of the American Psychology-Law Society.

Roles of a legal psychologist

Academics and research
Many legal psychologists work as professors in university psychology departments, criminal justice departments or law schools. Like other professors, legal psychologists generally conduct and publish empirical research, teach various classes, and mentor graduate and undergraduate students. Many legal psychologists also conduct research in a more general area of psychology (e.g., social, clinical, cognitive) with only a tangential legal focus. Those legal psychologists who work in law schools almost always hold a JD in addition to a PhD

Expert witnesses

Psychologists specifically trained in legal issues, as well as those with no formal training, are often called by legal parties to testify as expert witnesses. In criminal trials, an expert witness may be called to testify about eyewitness memory, mistaken identity, competence to stand trial, the propensity of a death-qualified jury to also be "pro-guilt", etc. Psychologists who focus on clinical issues often testify specifically about a defendant's competence, intelligence, etc. More general testimony about perceptual issues (e.g., adequacy of police sirens) may also come up in trial.

Experts, particularly psychology experts, are often accused of being "hired guns" or "stating the obvious". Eyewitness memory experts, such as Elizabeth Loftus, are often discounted by judges and lawyers with no empirical training because their research utilizes undergraduate students and "unrealistic" scenarios. If both sides have psychological witnesses, jurors may have the daunting task of assessing difficult scientific information.

Policy making and legislative guidance
Psychologists employed at public policy centers may attempt to influence legislative policy or may be called upon by state (or national) lawmakers to address some policy issue through empirical research. A psychologist working in public policy might suggest laws or help to evaluate a new legal practice (e.g., eyewitness lineups).

Advisory roles
Legal psychologists may hold advisory roles in court systems. They may advise legal decision makers, particularly judges, on psychological findings pertaining to issues in a case. The psychologist who acts as a court adviser provides similar input to one acting as an expert witness, but acts out of the domain of an adversarial system.

Amicus briefs
Psychologists can provide an amicus brief to the court. The American Psychological Association has provided briefs concerning mental illness, retardation and other factors. The amicus brief usually contains an opinion backed by scientific citations and statistics. The impact of an amicus brief by a psychological association is questionable. For instance, Justice Powell once called a reliance on statistics "numerology" and discounted results of several empirical studies. Judges who have no formal scientific training also may critique experimental methods, and some feel that judges only cite an amicus brief when the brief supports the judge's personal beliefs.

Trial consulting
Some legal psychologists work in trial consulting. No special training nor certification is needed to be a trial consultant, though an advanced degree is generally welcomed by those who would hire the trial consultant. The American Society of Trial Consultants does have a code of ethics for members, but there are no legally binding ethical rules for consultants.

Some psychologists who work in academics are hired as trial consultants when their expertise can be useful to a particular case. Other psychologists/consultants work for or with established trial consultant firms. The practice of law firms hiring "in-house" trial consultants is becoming more popular, but these consultants usually can also be used by the firms as practicing attorneys.

Trial consultants perform a variety of services for lawyers, such as picking jurors (usually relying on in-house or published statistical studies) or performing "mock trials" with focus groups. Trial consultants work on all stages of a case from helping to organize testimony, preparing witnesses to testify, picking juries, and even arranging "shadow jurors" to watch the trial unfold and provide input on the trial. There is some debate on whether the work of a trial consultant is protected under attorney-client privilege, especially when the consultant is hired by a party in the case and not by an attorney.

See also
 Applied psychology
 Empirical legal studies
 Forensic psychology
 Investigative psychology
 Police psychology
 List of United States Supreme Court cases involving mental health
 Therapeutic jurisprudence

References

External links
American Psychology-Law Society

Applied psychology
Science and law